The Premio Jaén (Jaén Prize) is the longest-running piano competition in Spain. It was established in 1958 and is held in the Andalusian city Jaén. The Competition has been a member of the World Federation of International Music Competitions since 2004.

Prize Winners

References

Music competitions in Spain
Piano competitions
Jaén, Spain
1958 establishments in Spain
Recurring events established in 1958